Eremaea fimbriata is a plant in the myrtle family, Myrtaceae and is endemic to the south-west of Western Australia. It is a small shrub with small leaves and single purple flowers on the ends of the branches. The fruits are woody, urn-shaped with a small opening at the top. Unlike other eremaeas which remain dormant during winter, Eremaea fimbriata begins the new year's growth in July or August.

Description
There are a few long, soft hairs on the upper surface and the lower surface is densely covered with short, fine hairs.

The flowers are pink to deep pink and are borne singly on the ends of long branches which grew in the previous year. Flowering occurs from July to September and is followed by fruits which are woody capsules.

Taxonomy and naming
Eremaea fimbriata was first formally described in 1839 by John Lindley in A Sketch of the Vegetation of the Swan River Colony. The specific epithet (fimbriata) is from the Latin fimbriatus meaning "fringed".

Distribution and habitat
Eremaea fimbriata occurs in near-coastal areas of the Irwin and Darling districts in the Geraldton Sandplains, Jarrah Forest and Swan Coastal Plain biogeographic regions. It grows in sandy soils, often with lateritic gravel.

Conservation
Eremaea fimbriata is classified as "not threatened" by the Western Australian Government Department of Parks and Wildlife.

References

fimbriata
Myrtales of Australia
Plants described in 1839
Endemic flora of Western Australia